Pwintbyu Township is a township of Minbu District in the Magway Division of Myanmar.  The principal town is Pwintbyu.

Kyeeohn Kyeewa multipurpose Dam Project implementation was started in 2002–2003. The first 37 megawatt-generator was operated in January 2012.

References

  

Townships of Magway Region